The Open Society and Its Enemies is a work on political philosophy by the philosopher Karl Popper, in which the author presents a "defence of the open society against its enemies", and offers a critique of theories of teleological historicism, according to which history unfolds inexorably according to universal laws. Popper indicts Plato, Hegel, and Marx for relying on historicism to underpin their political philosophies.

Written during World War II, The Open Society and Its Enemies was published in 1945 in London by Routledge in two volumes: "The Spell of Plato" and "The High Tide of Prophecy: Hegel, Marx, and the Aftermath". A one-volume edition with a new introduction by Alan Ryan and an essay by E. H. Gombrich was published by Princeton University Press in 2013. The work was listed as one of the Modern Library Board's 100 Best Nonfiction books of the 20th century.

The book critiques historicism and defends the open society and liberal democracy. Popper argues that Plato's political philosophy has dangerous tendencies towards totalitarianism, contrary to the benign idyll portrayed by most interpreters. He praises Plato's analysis of social change but rejects his solutions, which he sees as driven by fear of change brought about by the rise of democracies, and as contrary to the humanitarian and democratic views of Socrates and other thinkers of the Athenian "Great Generation". Popper also criticizes Hegel, tracing his ideas to Aristotle and arguing that they were at the root of 20th century totalitarianism. He agrees with Schopenhauer's view that Hegel "was a flat-headed, insipid, nauseating, illiterate charlatan, who reached the pinnacle of audacity in scribbling together and dishing up the craziest mystifying nonsense." Popper criticizes Marx at length for his historicism, which he believes led him to overstate his case, and rejects his radical and revolutionary outlook. Popper advocates for direct liberal democracy as the only form of government that allows institutional improvements without violence and bloodshed.

Summary 
Popper's book is divided into two volumes, which were only published as one volume in more recent editions. The first volume, The Spell of Plato, focuses on Plato, and the second volume, The High Tide of Prophecy, focuses on Karl Marx.

Volume 1: The Spell of Plato 
The first section, "The Myth of Origin and Destiny", contains chapters 1 through 3. The second section, "Plato's Descriptive Sociology", contains chapters 4 and 5. The third section, "Plato's Political Programme", contains chapters 6 through 9. The fourth and last section of the first volume, "The Background of Plato's Attack", only contains chapter 10. The volume is closed by an unnumbered section of "Addenda".

The Myth of Origin and Destiny 
Chapter 1, "Historicism and the Myth of Destiny", describes the historicist approach to social sciences, which Popper considers to be a flawed method. Historicism is "the doctrine that history is controlled by specific historical or evolutionary laws whose discovery would enable us to prophesy the destiny of man." Popper argues that the historicist approach gives poor results, and he outlines a method that he believes would yield better results. He also discusses how historicism originated and became entrenched in our culture. Popper provides "the doctrine of the chosen people" as an example of historicism. The doctrine assumes that God has chosen one people to be the selected instrument of His will, and that this people will inherit the earth – the law of historical development is laid down by the will of God. Popper argues that "the doctrine of the chosen people" grew out of the tribal form of social life, and he notes that other forms of historicist theories may still retain an element of collectivism. Popper identifies the two most important modern versions of historicism as the historical philosophy of racialism or fascism on the right and the Marxian historical philosophy on the left. Both theories base their historical forecasts on an interpretation of history which leads to the discovery of a law of its development.

Chapter 2, "Heraclitus", focuses on the emergence of historicism in ancient Greece, specifically through the philosophy of Heraclitus. Heraclitus believed in the idea of universal change and hidden destiny enforced by punishment, and saw strife or war as the dynamic and creative principle of all change, especially in social life. His philosophy was inspired by his personal experiences of social and political disturbances, and his emphasis on the importance of social dynamics reflects this.

Chapter 3, "Plato's Theory of Forms or Ideas", discusses the eponymous theory. It is longer than the first two chapters, and is divided by Popper into six parts. According to Popper, Plato's philosophy was heavily influenced by his experiences of political turmoil and instability, and he believed that moral degeneration leads to political degeneration. He strove to arrest this political change by establishing a state that does not degenerate or change, which he saw as the perfect state of the Golden Age. While Plato deviated from the tenets of historicism by believing in an ideal state that does not change, he shared with Heraclitus a tendency to shrink back from the last consequences of historicism.

This chapter introduces Popper's distinction between the social engineer and the historicist, of which he favors the former. The social engineer believes that humans can control history to achieve their goals, and sees politics as a tool to build and modify social institutions; he evaluates institutions based on their design, efficiency, and other practical factors. (Popper identifies two types of social engineering: piecemeal and utopian, which he further discusses in chapter nine.) In contrast, the historicist is interested in understanding the past, present, and future significance of institutions. They evaluate institutions based on their historical role, such as if they are divinely willed or serving important historical trends. Popper acknowledges that institutions are not simply machines and can have unique characteristics beyond their practical purpose.

This chapter also introduces Popper's distinction between  two different methods of understanding things: methodological essentialism and methodological nominalism, of which he favors the latter. Methodological essentialism is the view that science should aim to uncover the hidden reality or essence of things through intellectual intuition and to describe it in words through definitions. Methodological nominalism, by contrast, emphasizes the importance of describing how things behave in different situations, and especially whether there are any regularities in their behavior. According to Popper, natural sciences mostly use methodological nominalism, while the social sciences still rely on essentialist methods, which is one of the reasons for their backwardness. Popper notes that some people argue that the difference in method between natural and social sciences reflects an essential difference between the two fields, but he disagrees with this view.

Plato's Descriptive Sociology 
Chapter 4, "Change and Rest", describes Plato's sociology as based on the theory of Forms and universal flux and decay. It is long, and divided into five parts. According to Popper, Plato believed change can only lead towards imperfection and evil, which is a process of degeneration – he saw history as an illness, and set out a system of historical periods governed by a law of evolution. Plato's ideal state was not a progressive Utopian vision of the future, but rather a historical or even pre-historical one that attempted to reconstruct ancient tribal aristocracies to avoid class war. The ruling class in Plato's best state has an unchallengeable superiority and education. Breeding and training of the ruling class was necessary for ensuring stability, and Plato demanded the same principles be applied as in breeding dogs, horses, or birds. Popper summarizes Plato's systematic historicist sociology, which was an attempt to understand and interpret the changing social world.

Chapter 5, "Nature and Convention", introduces Popper's distinction between natural laws and normative laws. Popper divides stages of the development of this distinction throughout history, and then applies it to a further analysis of Plato. According to Popper, natural laws describe strict, unvarying regularities in nature, such as the laws of motion and gravity, while normative laws are rules that forbid or demand certain modes of conduct, such as the Ten Commandments. Normative laws can be enforced by people and are alterable, whereas natural laws are beyond human control and unalterable.

Popper believes that this distinction developed throughout history, starting from a naïve or magical monism, where there is no distinction made between natural and normative laws, and unpleasant experiences are the means by which people learn to adjust to their environment. Within this stage, there are two possibilities: naïve naturalism and naïve conventionalism. In the latter possibility, both natural and normative regularities are experienced as expressions of and dependent upon the decisions of man-like gods or demons. The breakdown of magical tribalism is connected to the realization that taboos are different in various tribes, that they are imposed and enforced by man, and that they may be broken without unpleasant repercussions if one can only escape the sanctions imposed by one's fellow-men. The development ends at what Popper calls critical dualism, which is the idea that norms and normative laws can be made and changed by humans, and cannot be derived from natural regularities or laws, although they are not necessarily arbitrary. This position was first reached by the Sophist Protagoras. It emphasizes that humans are morally responsible for norms, and should try to improve them if they are objectionable. It can also be described as a dualism of facts and decisions, meaning that decisions must be compatible with natural laws to be carried out, but they cannot be derived from those laws. Decisions can refer to a certain decision that has been made or the act of deciding itself.

According to Popper, there are three intermediate positions in this development from naïve monism to critical dualism, namely biological naturalism, ethical or juridical positivism, and psychological or spiritual naturalism, which combine elements of magical monism and critical dualism. Biological naturalism "is the theory that in spite of the fact that moral laws and the laws of states are arbitrary, there are some eternal unchanging laws of nature from which we can derive such norms." Popper argues that biological naturalism cannot be used to support ethical doctrines since it is impossible to base norms upon facts. Ethical positivism, on the other hand, believes that existing laws are the only possible standards of goodness and that norms are conventional. However, ethical positivism has often been conservative or authoritarian, invoking the authority of God. Popper argues that authoritarian or conservative principles are an expression of ethical nihilism, which is an extreme moral scepticism and a distrust of man and his possibilities. Psychological or spiritual naturalism is a combination of the two previous views, arguing that norms are a product of man and human society and, therefore, "an expression of the psychological or spiritual nature of man, and of the nature of human society." Popper says that this view was first formulated by Plato, and that although it is "plausible", it is "so wide and so vague that it may be used to defend anything".

Having laid down these distinctions, Popper uses the final parts of Chapter 5 to analyze Plato some more. Popper analyzes Plato's use of the term "nature" and its relationship with historicism. He also discusses Plato's view of the state as a super-organism, where the state is viewed as a unified whole and the individual citizen as an imperfect copy of the state. Plato's emphasis on oneness and wholeness is related to tribal collectivism, and he saw the individual as a means to serve the whole. Popper also discusses Plato's theory of degeneration in the state, where degeneration is a natural evolutionary law that causes decay in all generated things. Plato suggests that knowledge of breeding and the Platonic Number can prevent racial degeneration, but lacking a purely rational method, it will eventually occur. The basis of Plato's historicist sociology is racial degeneration, which "explains the origin of disunion in the ruling class, and with it, the origin of all historical development".

Plato's Political Programme 
Chapter 6, "Totalitarian Justice", analyzes what Popper describes as the totalitarian nature of Plato's political philosophy, which he believes is based on historicism and on Plato's "sociological doctrines concerning the conditions for the stability of class rule", as well as the philosopher's idea of justice and the philosopher-king. Popper argues that Plato intentionally introduced confusion by claiming, "in the Republic, that justice meant inequality" and class hierarchy, whereas "in general usage" in his time, "it meant equality". Popper discusses equalitarianism, individualism, and collectivism, and how they relate to Plato's opposition to natural privileges for natural leaders; he concludes that Plato's anti-individualism is deeply rooted in the fundamental dualism of his philosophy, and is anti-humanitarian and anti-Christian. Chapter 6 introduces Popper's theory of the state, which he calls protectionism, in the special sense that the state's primary purpose should be "the protection of the citizens' freedom". Although he believes it to be a liberal theory, he distinguishes it from the "policy of strict non-intervention", a.k.a. laissez-faire, since he believes that "protection of freedom" may be conceived of quite broadly, and may encompass measures of state control in education, since those may protect the young "from a neglect which would make them unable to defend their freedom". He acknowledges, however, that "too much state control in educational matters is a fatal danger to freedom, since it must lead to indoctrination" – he believes that "the important and difficult question of the limitations of freedom cannot be solved by a cut and dried formula."

Chapter 7, "The Principle of Leadership", critiques Plato's idea "that the natural rulers should rule and the natural slaves should slave". He argues that political power is not unchecked, and using this argument, he replaces Plato's fundamental question of "Who should rule?" with "How can we so organize political institutions that bad or incompetent rulers can be prevented from doing too much damage?" He discusses the distinction between personalism and institutionalism in politics – he believes that the problems of the day are largely personal, while building the future must necessarily be institutional. Popper also discusses Socrates' moral intellectualism and its democratic and anti-democratic aspects, as well as Plato's institutional demands regarding the highest form of education. He argues that "the very idea of selecting or educating future leaders is self-contradictory", and that "the secret of intellectual excellence is the spirit of criticism".

Chapter 8, "The Philosopher King", analyses Plato's idea of the philosopher king and how it relates to totalitarianism. Plato's philosopher king is not necessarily a truth seeker but a ruler who must use lies and deceit for the benefit of the state. Popper argues that Plato's emphasis on breeding for the creation of a race of godlike men and women destined for kingship and mastery is an attempt to create a perfect society dominated by a class of rulers. Furthermore, Plato's philosophy was a practical political manifesto rather than a theoretical treatise, and his idea of the philosopher king was an ideal ruler and not just a theoretical construct. Popper suggests that Plato considered only a few individuals, including himself and some of his friends, as true philosophers eligible for the post of philosopher-king.

Chapter 9, "Aestheticism, Perfectionism, Utopianism", focuses on Popper's distinction between two approaches to social engineering: utopian engineering and piecemeal engineering, of which he favors the latter. Utopian engineering requires a blueprint of the ideal society, in rough outline at least, and determines practical action by considering the best means for realizing the ultimate political aim. In contrast, piecemeal engineering adopts "the method of searching for, and fighting against, the greatest and most urgent evils of society, rather than searching for, and fighting for, its greatest ultimate good." The piecemeal engineer aims to improve the current situation of society by gradually fighting against suffering, injustice, and war, and other such social evils whose existence can be established relatively easily. In contrast, utopian engineering is less likely to be supported by the approval and agreement of a great number of people, since it is difficult to judge a blueprint for social engineering on a grand scale. Indeed, since Utopian engineers, according to Popper, tend to deny "that there are rational methods to determine once and for all" what the ideal is, and what the best means of its realization are", it follows that "any difference of opinion between Utopian engineers must therefore lead, in the absence of rational methods, to the use of power instead of reason, i.e. to violence." Popper argues that the piecemeal approach, which involves small-scale social experiments, is more effective and realistic than the utopian approach, which is more liable to attempt "the reconstruction of society as a whole, i.e. very sweeping changes whose practical consequences are hard to calculate, owing to our limited experiences". Popper emphasizes the importance of gaining experience through trial and error, and compares social engineering to mechanical engineering. He contrasts his criticism of Platonic Idealism with Marx's criticism of utopianism, advocating for a piecemeal approach to learn and change our views as we act.

The Background of Plato's Attack 
Chapter 10, titled "The Open Society and Its Enemies" like the book itself, examines Plato's belief in happiness as part of his political program and argues that Plato's treatment of happiness is "analogous to his treatment of justice", and similarly distorts general usage by tying the concept to class hierarchy. Popper believes that Plato's mission was to fight against social change and social dissension. The breakdown of the closed, tribal society, chiefly caused by the development of sea-communications and commerce, led to the partial dissolution of old ways of life, political revolutions and reactions, and the invention of critical discussion, which was free from magical obsessions. Athenian imperialism developed these two as its main characteristics. Popper discusses Thucydides' attitude towards democracy and Athens's empire, arguing that Thucydides was an anti-democrat who viewed Athens's empire as a form of tyranny. Popper defends Athens' imperial expansion by arguing that tribalist exclusiveness and self-sufficiency could only be superseded by some form of imperialism; he explains why some of the most thoughtful and gifted Athenians resisted the open society's attraction, and introduces the "Great Generation", the generation that lived in Athens just before and during the Peloponnesian War, which he considers a turning point in the history of mankind. Finally, he discusses Socrates' criticism of Athenian democracy and his belief in individualism, as well as what he considers Plato's betrayal of Socrates by implicating him in "his grandiose attempt to construct the theory of the arrested society". Plato's argument against democracy, as Popper interprets it, is based on the belief that the root of evil is "the 'Fall of Man', the breakdown of the closed society"; according to Popper, Plato "transfigured his hatred of individual initiative, and his wish to arrest all change, into a love of justice and temperance, of a heavenly state in which everybody is satisfied and happy and in which the crudity of money-grabbing is replaced by laws of generosity and friendship".

Addenda 
A 1957 addendum to the first volume, "Plato and Geometry", discusses Popper's treatment of Plato's views on geometry. A 1961 addendum, titled "The Dating of the Theaetetus", discusses the dating of the Platonic dialogue by that name. A second 1961 addendum, titled "Reply to a Critic", makes an extended reply to various claims made in the book In Defense of Plato, by Ronald B. Levinson. A final addendum, added in 1965 and untitled (numbered "IV"), recommends the book Modern Dictatorship by Diana Spearman, in particular its chapter titled "The Theory of Autocracy".

Volume 2: The High Tide of Prophecy 
The first section, "The Rise of Oracular Philosophy", includes chapter 11 and chapter 12. The second section, "Marx's Method", contains chapter 13 through chapter 17. The third section, "Marx's Prophecy", includes chapter 18 through chapter 21. The fourth section, "Marx's Ethics" has only chapter 22. The fifth section, "The Aftermath", contains chapter 23 and chapter 24. A "Conclusion" section includes only chapter 25, and is followed by an unnumbered section of "Addenda".

The Rise of Oracular Philosophy 
Chapter 11, "The Aristotelian Roots of Hegelianism", discusses the Aristotelian roots of historicism and its connections to totalitarianism. Popper examines Aristotle's philosophy and his endorsement of Plato's naturalistic theory of slavery, as well as his theory of the Best State. Popper also explains the problem of definitions and the essentialist method of Definitions used by Aristotle. He argues that modern science has a fundamentally different approach to definitions and scientific progress. Popper also discusses the conflict between the Platonic-Aristotelian philosophy and the Great Generation, and how Christianity initially opposed Platonizing Idealism and intellectualism, but changed significantly when it became powerful in the Roman empire.

Chapter 12, "Hegel and the New Tribalism", is a long critique of Hegel's philosophy, which Popper calls "the source of all contemporary historicism". It is the longest single chapter in the book, and more than twice as long as either the average or median chapter. Popper argues that Hegel's philosophy was unintelligible and deceptive. Focusing on "Hegel's Platonizing worship of the state," Popper suggests that Hegel's philosophy was not inspired by a genuine pursuit of truth but rather by ulterior motives. The second section analyzes Hegel's philosophy, contrasting it with that of Plato; it talks about "the two pillars of Hegelianism", the dialectic triad and the philosophy of identity. Popper then states that the rest of the chapter will be confined to the practical political applications made by Hegel of these abstract theories, which will show the apologetic purpose of all his labours.

Popper argues that the rise of German nationalism has a strong affinity with the revolt against reason and the open society; he believes that "the principle of the national state, that is to say, the political demand that the territory of every state should coincide with the territory inhabited by one nation" is a myth, an irrational and Utopian dream of naturalism and tribal collectivism. He briefly discusses the development of the opinions of Fichte, who was one of the founders of German nationalism; then he goes back to criticizing "Hegel's hysterical historicism", which he views as "the fertilizer to which modern totalitarianism owes its rapid growth". In the fifth section, he argues that "nearly all the more important ideas of modern totalitarianism are directly inherited from Hegel". Popper states that "the modern myth of Blood and Soil", which is central to fascist ideology, "has its exact counterpart in Plato's Myth of the Earthborn".

Marx's Method 
Chapter 13, "Marx's Sociological Determinism", is the first of Popper's chapters on Marx. Popper argues that Marx's historical prophecies did not come true, and Marx "misled scores of intelligent people into believing that historical prophecy is the scientific way of approaching social problems". Popper critiques the idea of historical materialism, which is the foundation of Marxist theory, arguing that it is a flawed view of history that assumes, as he had phrased it in chapter 1, "that there are specific historical laws which can be discovered, and upon which predictions regarding the future of mankind can be based". He also argues that historical change is not predetermined and that societies can choose their own path. Finally, Popper argues that the social world is too complex to be studied using the same methods as the natural sciences, and social scientists must use a different method that takes into account the complexity of human behavior and social institutions.

Chapter 14, "The Autonomy of Sociology", develops Marx's criticisms of psychologism, the idea that all social laws can be reduced to psychological laws. Popper does this in the form of an extended argument against Mill's version of the idea, explaining at the end of the chapter that he did so because he considered Mill "a worthier opponent than Hegel", who was Marx's real target. He emphasizes the importance of the social environment and its institutions in explaining social phenomena. Popper critiques what he calls the conspiracy theory of society, which is "the view that an explanation of a social phenomenon consists in the discovery of the men or groups who are interested in the occurrence of this phenomenon (sometimes it is a hidden interest which has first to be revealed), and who have planned and conspired to bring it about." He argues that the main task of social sciences is to analyze the unintended social repercussions of intentional human actions. He concludes that psychological analysis should not be used to develop a standard of what is considered rational behavior in a particular situation, and that the problems of society are irreducible to those of human nature.

Chapter 15, "Economic Historicism", discusses Marx's "historical materialism" philosophy, which replaces Hegelian psychologism with materialism. Popper distinguishes Marx's philosophy from the beliefs held by what he calls "Vulgar Marxists", in allusion to Marx's term "Vulgar Economist". Vulgar Marxists believe that Marx's philosophy centers around the idea that "economic motives and especially class interest are the driving forces of history", and that the goal of Marxism is to reveal the hidden motives of those in power who create social misery to gratify their desire for profit. Popper argues that this interpretation is a misreading of the philosophy of Marx, who believed that economic motives were "symptoms of the corrupting influence of the social system", not "the driving forces of history". He saw social "phenomena as war, depression, unemployment, and hunger in the midst of plenty" as "unwanted social consequences of actions" that were  "directed towards different results", rather than as "the result of a cunning conspiracy" on the part of those in power. Marx viewed human actors, including those in power, as "puppets, irresistibly pulled by economic wires—by historical forces over which they have no control".

Marx viewed social science as scientific history focused on the material conditions of society, but Popper criticizes his historicism while supporting his economism, "i.e. the claim that the economic organization of society, the organization of our exchange of matter with nature, is fundamental for all social institutions and especially for their historical development." Popper believes that Marx's economism is valuable because it emphasizes the fundamental role of economic organization in all social institutions and historical development, but warns against reductionist and essentialist views.

Chapter 16, "The Classes", discusses Marx's statement that "the history of all hitherto existing society is a history of class struggles", and its implications that history is determined by the war of classes rather than nations. He explains Marx's theory of classes as an institutional or objective social situation that influences human minds and makes them act accordingly. Popper notes the dangers of oversimplifying political conflicts as struggles between exploiters and exploited, and warns of the dangers inherent in Marx's sweeping historicist generalization. Despite his criticisms, Popper finds admirable Marx's attempt to use the "logic of the class situation" to explain the working of institutions in the industrial system.

Chapter 17, "The Legal and the Social System", discusses Marx's theory of the state and the implications for political action. Marx believed that the legal and political system was a superstructure upon the actual productive forces of the economic system, and the state was an organ for class domination. Popper argues that although Marx's theory was insightful, it contained only a grain of truth and has been refuted by subsequent experience. Popper suggests that economic interventionism is necessary to safeguard freedom, and political power is fundamental and can control economic power. He argues that formal freedom is essential in ensuring a democratic economic policy, and social engineering is necessary to tame economic demons. Popper criticizes the Marxist approach to the control of power and argues that democracy is the only means to achieve control over the state.

Marx's Prophecy 
Chapter 18, "The Coming of Socialism", discusses Marx's economic historicism. Popper explains Marx's analysis of the economic forces of capitalism and his prophecy of the coming of socialism, which consisted of three steps. He argues that Marx's conclusion of a classless society does not follow from the premises. He also notes that the economic system of modern democracies is different from the capitalism Marx described, and most of Marx's ten-point program for a communist revolution has been put into practice in modern democracies. Popper argues that strengthening the premises of Marx's prophetic argument could lead to a valid conclusion, but assumptions about moral and ideological factors are beyond our ability to reduce to economic factors. Popper examines the effects of Marx's historical prophecy on recent European history and notes that Marxist leaders had no practical program beyond "Workers of all countries, unite!" and waited for the promised suicide of capitalism, but it was too late, and their opportunity was gone.

Chapter 19, "The Social Revolution", is a further critique of Marxism, discussing its flaws and potential for violence. Popper argues that Marxism does not account for the many possible developments that could occur in society, and its prophecy of a potentially violent revolution is harmful. Popper also examines the ambiguous attitude towards the problem of violence in Marxist parties and how it influences the possibility of winning the battle of democracy. Ultimately, Popper asserts that all political problems are institutional problems and that progress towards more equality can only be safeguarded by the institutional control of power.

Chapter 20, "Capitalism and Its Fate", discusses Marx's theories of capitalism. Marx believed that the accumulation of capital would lead to "(a) increased productivity; increase of wealth; and concentration of wealth in a few hands; (b) increase of pauperism and misery; the workers are kept on subsistence or starvation wages, mainly by the fact that the surplus of workers, called the 'industrial reserve army', keeps the wages on the lowest possible level." Popper criticizes Marx's theory of value, but agrees with his analysis of the pressure exerted by surplus population on wages. However, he disputes Marx's prophetic argument of the law of increasing misery and suggests that trade unions, collective bargaining, and strikes can prevent capitalists from using the industrial reserve army to keep wages down. Popper also discusses Marx's theory of the trade cycle and surplus population, and his argument that the rate of profit tends to fall, leading to capitalism's inevitable collapse.

Chapter 21, "An Evaluation of the Prophecy", explains that Marx's prophetic conclusions drawn from the observations of contemporary economic tendencies are invalid, mainly due to the poverty of historicism as an epistemology. Marx's sociological and economic analyses of contemporary society were one-sided but descriptive, and his system of unrestrained capitalism was not going to last much longer. Marx's hope for a decrease in state influence is commendable. "One of the historical tendencies that Marx claimed to have discovered", which "seems to be of a more persistent character than others", is the "tendency towards the accumulation of the means of production, and especially towards increasing the productivity of labour". Marx emphasized the connection between the development of productive forces and the credit system, which led to the trade cycle, and his theory of the trade cycle says that an approach towards full employment "stimulates inventors and investors to create and to introduce new labour-saving machinery, thereby giving rise (first to a short boom and then) to a new wave of unemployment and depression." When productivity increases, investments increase, consumption increases, labor time decreases, and the quantity of goods produced but not consumed increases. "Marx saw many things in the right light", but "he had no inkling of what was lying ahead", and his predictions were wrong.

Marx's Ethics 
Chapter 22, "The Moral Theory of Historicism", discusses the ethical theory implied in Marx's "Capital". Marx condemned capitalism due to its inherent injustice and oligarchical nature, emphasizing the moral aspect of social institutions. Popper questions the historicist moral theory that all social changes and political revolutions are due to the economics of the epoch concerned, and argues that man and his aims are a product of society to some extent, but society is also a product of man and his aims. Popper concludes that our views and actions are not solely determined by heredity, education, and social influences, and gives the example of Beethoven to explain the sociological aspects of his work.

The Aftermath 
Chapter 23, "The Sociology of Knowledge", discusses the historicist philosophies of Hegel and Marx, which attempt to predict and control change in a changing social environment. Popper argues that this attitude is closely related to "the Marxist doctrine that our opinions, including our moral and scientific opinions, are determined by class interest, and more generally by the social and historical situation of our time". Popper introduces the sociology of knowledge and argues that scientific objectivity is achieved through "the friendly-hostile co-operation of many scientists" and the public expression of criticism and opinion. He also criticizes the sociology of knowledge's failure to understand the social aspects of scientific method and suggests that the social sciences need a social technology that can be tested by piecemeal social engineering. Popper believes that social scientists should forget about intertwining 'knowledge' and 'will' and focus on the practical problems of our time using the same theoretical methods as other sciences.

Chapter 24, "Oracular Philosophy and the Revolt against Reason", explores "the conflict between rationalism and irrationalism", which is "has become the most important intellectual, and perhaps even moral, issue of our time". In the sense in which he speaks of it in this chapter, rationalism is "an attitude that seeks to solve as many problems as possible by an appeal to reason, i.e. to clear thought and experience, rather than by an appeal to emotions and passions" – it is not opposed to "empiricism", but rather to irrationalism, the attitude which instead "insists that emotions and passions rather than reason are the mainsprings of human action". Popper argues for individualism and the need for rational thinking in society, while critiquing the irrationalist position that he believes is fashionable today.

Popper proposes critical rationalism, "which recognizes the fact that the fundamental rationalist attitude results from an (at least tentative) act of faith—from faith in reason." This is opposed to uncritical or comprehensive rationalism, which "can be described as the attitude of the person who says 'I am not prepared to accept anything that cannot be defended by means of argument or experience'", including rationalism itself – which Popper believes is self-defeating. The choice between adopting a more or less radical form of irrationalism or critical rationalism is not just an intellectual decision but a moral one, which "will deeply affect our whole attitude towards other men, and towards the problems of social life".

Popper argues that irrationalism leads to an attitude "that is hopelessly unrealistic. For it does not consider the weakness of 'human nature', the feeble intellectual endowment of most and their obvious dependence upon emotions and passions", and also leads to "the adoption of an anti-equalitarian attitude in political life, i.e. in the field of problems concerned with the power of man over man", which Popper considers "criminal". Popper urges that critical rationalism, which emphasizes argument and experience and suggests impartiality, is a better approach than irrationalism. Popper also criticizes influential irrationalist philosophers of the 20th century, including A.N. Whitehead and Ludwig Wittgenstein.

Conclusion 
Chapter 25, "Has History Any Meaning?", discusses the role of theories in natural science, the limitations of historical theories, the worship of power, and the idea of theistic historicism. Popper highlights the difficulty of imposing higher values in education, and argues that history has no meaning and no ends, but we can give it meaning by imposing our ends upon it. Finally, he discusses the problem of nature and convention again, stating that ethical problems arise only in social situations.

Addenda 
A lengthy 1961 addendum to the second volume, titled "Facts, Standards, and Truth: a Further Criticism of Relativism", critiques relativism, which is the idea that there is no objective truth, and the choice between competing theories is arbitrary. Popper suggests that there is an objective way to determine if a statement corresponds to the facts and also to establish a standard in the moral and political fields, thereby countering relativism. Popper argues for fallibilism, acknowledging that human knowledge is subject to error and that the quest for certainty is a mistaken one. Popper also explains the idea of getting closer to the truth, which is fundamental to the growth of knowledge, and he refutes the notion that this idea is illegitimate. Popper highlights the consequences of the decline of authoritarian religion leading to widespread relativism and nihilism. Additionally, Popper explains the dualism of facts and standards, where standards can never be derived from facts and must be created, criticized, and improved, leading to a never-ending process of the growth of knowledge.

A 1965 addendum, titled "Note on Schwarzschild's Book on Marx", notes that Popper would not have given Marx such a sympathetic treatment if he had previously had access to the evidence given about Marx's character in the book The Red Prussian, by Leopold Schwarzschild. Popper believes that this evidence, "especially from the Marx–Engels correspondence", "shows that Marx was less of a humanitarian, and less of a lover of freedom, than he is made to appear" in The Open Society and its Enemies.

Endnotes 
The Open Society and its Enemies has extensive endnotes, which, together, are about as lengthy as the book's first volume. They are mostly bibliographical in nature, giving quotations from Plato and Marx that support the assertions made in the main body.

One endnote that became very popular was note 4 to chapter 7, since it defines the paradox of tolerance, the idea that "unlimited tolerance must lead to the disappearance of tolerance. If we extend unlimited tolerance even to those who are intolerant, if we are not prepared to defend a tolerant society against the onslaught of the intolerant, then the tolerant will be destroyed, and tolerance with them." This idea is not brought up at all in the main text of the book, which is much more concerned with the related paradox of freedom, "the argument that freedom in the sense of absence of any restraining control must lead to very great restraint, since it makes the bully free to enslave the meek". According to Popper, the paradox of freedom was "used first, and with success, by Plato", but was "never grasped" by Marx, who held the "naïve view that, in a classless society, state power would lose its function and 'wither away'". Popper begins note 4 to chapter 7 by defining the paradox of freedom and then, as an aside, further defines the paradox of tolerance and another paradox, called the paradox of democracy, "or more precisely, of majority-rule; i.e. the possibility that the majority may decide that a tyrant should rule."

Publication history 
As Popper wrote in academic obscurity in New Zealand during World War II, several colleagues in philosophy and the social sciences assisted with the book's path to publication. His friend E.H. Gombrich was entrusted with the task of finding a publisher; Lionel Robbins and Harold Laski reviewed the manuscript; J.N. Findlay suggested the book's title after three others had been discarded. ('A Social Philosophy for Everyman' was the original title of the manuscript; 'Three False Prophets: Plato-Hegel-Marx' and 'A Critique of Political Philosophy' were also considered and rejected.) Friedrich Hayek wanted to recruit Popper to the London School of Economics and was enthused by his turn to social philosophy.

History until publication, as told by Gombrich 
Gombrich wrote down his "Personal Recollections" on book's publication, and these were published with the book in the 2013 Princeton one-volume edition. Gombrich explained that the manuscript was sent from New Zealand to England in the middle of World War II and took two-and-a-half years to publish. Gombrich kept a collection of letters, which he now shares, revealing that Popper saw his book as an "urgent" new philosophy of politics and history, trying to contribute to an understanding of the totalitarian revolt against civilization. Popper believed that the persistent hostility to the open society is due to the strain of civilization, as well as the sense of drift, which is associated with the transition from the closed tribal societies of the past to the individualistic civilization that originated in Athens in the fifth century BC. Gombrich received the manuscript and helped Popper send it to various publishers in England.

On August 19, 1943, Gombrich received a long letter from Karl Popper, which included a reply to the former's critical remarks on Popper's book "The Open Society and Its Enemies". Popper discussed the honesty of Schopenhauer and Hegel and argued that he is not biased by the fact that the democratic creed of the West is based on Christianity. Additionally, Popper shared his excitement about being offered a readership at the London School of Economics (LSE), thanks to the help of his friend, Hayek. Gombrich received instructions from Popper on how to apply for the position, along with Popper's CV and references. Popper also defended the length and complexity of his book, claiming that it achieves a rare degree of lucidity and simplicity despite being "thronged with thoughts on every single page".

In October 1944, Popper reported finishing two important articles on "Private and Public Values" and "The Refutation of Determinism," and intended to return to practical methodology and music after completing another article titled "The Logic of Freedom." Popper was still awaiting a publication date from Routledge and considering offers from universities in New Zealand and Australia. Gombrich also revealed that Popper's head of department at Canterbury had made derogatory comments about him, and Popper was eager to leave. Popper was ill during April, but his health improved while vacationing in the mountains. On May 21st, while on a bus in New Zealand, he received a cable from Cambridge congratulating him on his London appointment and thanking him for an excellent article.

Despite the difficulties and worries that Karl Popper and his wife faced in traveling from New Zealand to England during World War II, including the prospect of meeting new people and the fear that their permits to enter Great Britain would be denied, they finally arrived in England and were greeted by Gombrich and his family. Gombrich gave Popper the first copy of his book "The Open Society and Its Enemies," which Popper eagerly scrutinized on the way to Gombrich's house. Gombrich's "Recollections" end on a reflective note, musing on the immense contributions that Popper made to intellectual discourse in the decades that followed.

History after publication 
The book was not published in Russia until 1992. In 2019, the book was released in audiobook format for the first time, narrated by Liam Gerrard. The audiobook was produced by arrangement with the University of Klagenfurt/Karl Popper Library, by Tantor Media, a division of Recorded Books.

Reception and influence 
Popper's book remains one of the most popular defenses of Western liberal values in the post-World War II era. Gilbert Ryle, reviewing Popper's book just two years after its publication and agreeing with him, wrote that Plato "was Socrates' Judas." The Open Society and Its Enemies was praised by the philosophers Bertrand Russell, who called it "a work of first-class importance" and "a vigorous and profound defence of democracy", and Sidney Hook who called it a "subtly argued and passionately written" critique of the "historicist ideas that threaten the love of freedom [and] the existence of an open society". Hook calls Popper's critique of the cardinal beliefs of historicism "undoubtedly sound", noting that historicism "overlooks the presence of genuine alternatives in history, the operation of plural causal processes in the historical pattern, and the role of human ideals in redetermining the future". Nevertheless, Hook argues that Popper "reads Plato too literally when it serves his purposes and is too cocksure about what Plato's 'real' meaning is when the texts are ambiguous", and calls Popper's treatment of Hegel "downright abusive" and "demonstrably false", noting that "there is not a single reference to Hegel in Adolf Hitler's Mein Kampf", though neither does Popper refer to Hitler.

Some other philosophers were critical. Walter Kaufmann believed that Popper's work has many virtues, including its attack against totalitarianism, and many suggestive ideas. However, he also found it to have serious flaws, writing that Popper's interpretations of Plato were flawed and that Popper had provided a "comprehensive statement" of older myths about Hegel. Kaufmann commented that despite Popper's hatred of totalitarianism, Popper's method was "unfortunately similar to that of totalitarian 'scholars'".

In his The Open Philosophy and the Open Society: A Reply to Dr. Karl Popper's Refutations of Marxism (1968), the Marxist author Maurice Cornforth defended Marxism against Popper's criticisms. Though disagreeing with Popper, Cornforth nevertheless called him "perhaps the most eminent" critic of Marxism. The philosopher Robert C. Solomon writes that Popper directs an "almost wholly unjustified polemic" against Hegel, one which has helped to give Hegel a reputation as a "moral and political reactionary". The Marxist economist Ernest Mandel identifies The Open Society and Its Enemies as part of a literature, beginning with German social democrat Eduard Bernstein, that criticizes the dialectical method Marx borrowed from Hegel as "useless", "metaphysical", or "mystifying." He faults Popper and the other critics for their "positivist narrowness".

The political theorist Rajeev Bhargava argues that Popper "notoriously misreads Hegel and Marx", and that the formulation Popper deployed to defend liberal political values is "motivated by partisan ideological considerations grounded curiously in the most abstract metaphysical premises". In Jon Stewart's anthology The Hegel Myths and Legends (1996), The Open Society and Its Enemies is listed as a work that has propagated "myths" about Hegel. Stephen Houlgate writes that while Popper's accusation that Hegel sought to deceive others by use of dialectic is famous, it is also ignorant, as is Popper's charge that Hegel's account of sound and heat in the Encyclopedia of the Philosophical Sciences is "gibberish" although he does not elaborate further what specifically Hegel meant.

The Open Society Foundations, created by investor George Soros, were inspired in name and purpose by Popper's book.

The philosopher Joseph Agassi credits Popper with showing that historicism is a factor common to both fascism and Bolshevism.

See also 
 Criticism of democracy
 Horseshoe theory
 Paradox of voting
 Paradox of tolerance

References

External links 
 A detailed summary of the book
 The Hegel Myth and Its Method
 The Open Society And Its Enemies Vol I 1947 from the Internet Archive
 The Open Society And Its Enemies Vol II 1947 from the Internet Archive

1945 non-fiction books
American non-fiction books
Books about Georg Wilhelm Friedrich Hegel
Books about Karl Marx
Books about liberalism
Books about totalitarianism
Books by Karl Popper
English-language books
Books in political philosophy
Routledge books
Works about Platonism